The second USS Maryland (ACR-8/CA-8), also referred to as "Armored Cruiser No. 8", and later renamed Frederick, was a United States Navy  armored cruiser.

She was laid down on 7 October 1901 by the Newport News Drydock & ShipbuildingCo., Newport News, Virginia, launched on 12 September 1903, sponsored by Miss Jennie Scott Waters; and commissioned on 18 April 1905, Captain Royal R. Ingersoll in command.

Service history

Pre-World War I
In October 1905, following shakedown, Maryland joined the Atlantic Fleet for operations along the east coast and in the Caribbean, where she took part in the 1906 winter maneuvers off Cuba. The next summer, she conducted a training cruise for Massachusetts Naval Militiamen, and then readied for transfer to the Pacific. Departing Newport on 8 September 1906, she sailed – via San Francisco and Hawaii — for the Asiatic Station, where she remained until October 1907. She then returned to San Francisco and for the next decade she cruised throughout the Pacific, participating in survey missions to Alaska (1912 and 1913); carrying United States Secretary of State Knox to Tokyo for the funeral of Emperor Meiji Tenno (September 1912); steaming off the Central American coast to aid, if necessary, Americans endangered by political turmoil in Mexico and Nicaragua (1913, 1914, and 1916); and making numerous training cruises to Hawaii and the South-Central Pacific. The practice torpedo, which was fitted with collapsible warhead to avoid damage, actually punctured Marylands hull 9 feet below the waterline causing enough flooding to take on a 5 degree list. The exercise required the Navy to rethink torpedo and submarine defenses for ships large than armored cruisers.

World War I
When the United States Congress declared war on Imperial Germany on 6 April 1917, the armored cruiser, renamed Frederick'''---in order to free up her original name for use with the  ---on 9 November 1916, was en route from Puget Sound to San Francisco. Taking on men and supplies at the latter port, she got underway for the Atlantic. From May 1917 – January 1918, she patrolled the southeastern Atlantic off the coast of South America. On 1 February, she was assigned to escort duty in the North Atlantic, and until the signing of the Armistice, she convoyed troopships east of the 37th meridian. By 20 November, she was attached to the Cruiser and Destroyer Force, and before mid-1919 had completed six round trips returning troops from France. Detached from that duty, she entered the Philadelphia Navy Yard where she was briefly placed in reduced commission.

Inter-war periodFrederick crossed the Atlantic again, carrying the US Olympic Team to Antwerp, Belgium, as she conducted a naval reservist training cruise in July 1920. At the end of that year, she returned to the Pacific Fleet. Serving as flagship of the Train, Pacific Fleet, for the next year, she conducted only one lengthy cruise, to South America in March 1921. Operations off the west coast took up the remainder of her active duty career, and on 14 February 1922 she decommissioned and entered the Reserve Fleet at Mare Island. She was struck from the Naval Vessel Register on 13 November 1929 and sold on 11 February 1930.

In 1921, Frederick was used for several scenes in Harold Lloyd's first full-length film, the comedy A Sailor-Made Man. Camera (vol. 4, no. 29, p. 8) mentions a dinner party for the cast that was given by the officers of the ship.

References

Citations

Bibliography

Alden, John D. American Steel Navy: A Photographic History of the U.S. Navy from the Introduction of the Steel Hull in 1883 to the Cruise of the Great White Fleet. Annapolis, Maryland: Naval Institute Press, 1989. 
Friedman, Norman. U.S. Cruisers: An Illustrated Design History. Annapolis, Maryland: Naval Institute Press, 1984. 
Musicant, Ivan. U.S. Armored Cruisers: A Design and Operational History.'' Annapolis, Maryland: Naval Institute Press, 1985.

External links

hazegray.org: USS Maryland / Frederick
Camera excerpt mentioning the movie
Mare Island Navy Yard  – 1928. Elbridge Ayer Burbank pencil sketch.
Photo gallery at Naval Historical Center 

Pennsylvania-class cruisers
Ships built in Newport News, Virginia
1903 ships
Banana Wars ships of the United States
World War I cruisers of the United States